Fourth Ward School, also known as the Wiles Hill School, is a historic school building located at Morgantown, Monongalia County, West Virginia. It consists of the original 1910 school building with two historic additions from 1939 and 1952, and the 1983 gymnasium building.  It is a two-story, red brick, Romanesque Revival building on a raised basement and water table of ashlar sandstone.  The 1939 rear addition was built as a Public Works Administration project and has plain Art Deco style trim  The 1939 addition contains a stage and an auditorium / cafeteria.

It was listed on the National Register of Historic Places in 2004.

References

Art Deco architecture in West Virginia
Buildings and structures in Morgantown, West Virginia
National Register of Historic Places in Monongalia County, West Virginia
Public Works Administration in West Virginia
Romanesque Revival architecture in West Virginia
School buildings completed in 1910
Schools in Monongalia County, West Virginia
School buildings on the National Register of Historic Places in West Virginia